You Am I is the ninth studio album by the Australian rock band You Am I, released on 8 October 2010.

The first single "Shuck" was premiered on Triple J radio on 17 August and released as a downloadable single.

From 29 September 2010, the band's website is streaming the entire album.

On 17 October, the album debuted at #18 on the Australian ARIA Albums Chart.

Track listing
 "We Hardly Knew You" – 3:45
 "Kicking the Balustrade" – 3:35
 "Lie and Face the Sun" – 2:54
 "The Good Ones" – 3:57
 "Shuck" – 4:28
 "Crime" – 4:38
 "The Ocean" – 4:28
 "Pinpricks" – 2:14
 "Waiting to Be Found Out" – 3:52
 "Trigger Finger" – 3:35
 "Let's Not Get Famous" – 4:46

(all songs written by Tim Rogers)

Personnel
Tim Rogers – guitars, vocals
Davey Lane – guitars, backing vocals, keys
Andy Kent – bass guitar, backing vocals
Rusty Hopkinson – drums, backing vocals
Megan Washington – backing vocals
Lanie Lane – backing vocals
Stevie Hesketh – Keyboard, Piano

Charts

References

External links
Official You Am I site
You Am I fan site
You Am I at Naked Dwarf
Tim Rogers official site
Streamed audio player

2010 albums
You Am I albums